West Rutland State Forest covers  in West Rutland, Vermont in Rutland County. The forest is managed by the Vermont Department of Forests, Parks, and Recreation. 

Activities in the forest include hunting, primitive camping and walking.

References

External links
Official website

Vermont state forests
Protected areas of Rutland County, Vermont
West Rutland, Vermont
Protected areas established in 1913
1913 establishments in Vermont